Osvaldo Silva Galdames (1940–2019) was a Chilean historian active within the field of prehistory. He was a founder of the academic history journals Cuadernos de Historia and Revista de Historia Indígena, as well being a driving force behind the establishment of the Magíster de Historia con mención en etnohistoria at the University of Chile. At the same university he served as director of the department for Historical Science for many years. Among Silva's contributions to history was a proposal for a different chronology of the Inca rule in Chile.

He was born on May 24 of 1940 in Santiago, being the son of Osvaldo Silva Rivera and Berta Galdames Ramírez. He was married with Paulina Dittborn Cordua.

References

1940 births
2019 deaths
Anthropology educators
Prehistorians
20th-century Chilean historians
20th-century Chilean male writers
21st-century Chilean historians
21st-century Chilean male writers
Chilean anthropologists
Chilean schoolteachers
Temple University alumni
University of Chile alumni
Academic staff of the University of Chile
People from Santiago
Historians of the Mapuche world